Sven-Ove Svensson (9 June 1922 – 21 December 1986) was a Swedish footballer who played as a midfielder for Helsingborgs IF and the Sweden national team.

Career
Svensson played most of his career in Helsingborgs IF in Allsvenskan. Having made his debut in the Sweden national team in 1951 he was capped 31 times scoring 8 goals. He won guldbollen in 1954. In 1956 he was injured and his career was destroyed.

References

External links
 http://wwwc.aftonbladet.se/sport/guldbollen/1954.html

1922 births
1986 deaths
Association football midfielders
Swedish footballers
Sweden international footballers
Helsingborgs IF players